The Philippine House Committee on Housing and Urban Development, or House Housing and Urban Development Committee is a standing committee of the Philippine House of Representatives.

Jurisdiction 
As prescribed by House Rules, the committee's jurisdiction is on shelter delivery and management of urbanization issues and concerns which includes the following:
 Urban land reform
 Urban planning and development
 Welfare of the urban poor

Members, 18th Congress

Historical members

18th Congress

Chairperson 
 Strike Revilla (Cavite–2nd, NUP) August 5, 2019 – December 14, 2020

See also
 House of Representatives of the Philippines
 List of Philippine House of Representatives committees
 Department of Human Settlements and Urban Development

References

External links 
House of Representatives of the Philippines

Housing
Housing in the Philippines